These are the results of the women's triple jump event at the 2001 World Championships in Athletics in Edmonton, Alberta, Canada which occurred August 3–12. At the 2001 World Championships there were a total of twenty two events that women competed in, eight of which were in the same category, field events, as the triple jump. Twenty four total women competed in the qualification round which contained Group A  and Group B, composed of twelve athletes each. The athletes came from nineteen different nationalities including two from the United States and Romania, and three from Russia. Out of the twenty four women in the qualification round, twelve got to move on to the final round  where the gold, silver, and bronze medals were given out.

Medalists

Schedule
All times are Mountain Standard Time (UTC−7)

Results

Qualification
Qualification: Qualifying Performance 14.05 (Q) or at least 12 best performers (q) advance to the final.

Final

References
Results
IAAF

Triple Jump
Triple jump at the World Athletics Championships
2001 in women's athletics